The British Rail Class 129 was a class of single-car diesel multiple units (DMU) built in 1955 for British Rail. Only three were built by Cravens and were introduced in 1958. The class was built for parcels traffic like the Class 128. One unit (55997) survived into departmental service being named 'Hydra'. The driving ends of a Class 129 car bore a visible similarity to that of the Class 105, also built by Cravens.

Fleet list

Departmental Usage

One unit, M55997, was converted as a test bed for hydrostatic drive in 1980, was renumbered RDB 975385, and named Laboratory 9 ‘Hydra’.  

It was fitted hydrostatic transmission having the normal Leyland Motors 680 six cylinder engine driving two Bosch Rexroth Hydramatic axial piston pumps. Each pump supplied fluid to a Volvo fixed displacement compact axle-end motor which drove the axle directly.

This arrangement was only fitted to one bogie, the other one retaining its normal drive but with the cardan shaft disconnected.

The unit was finally withdrawn in January 1986 and scrapped in August that year by Vic Berry at Leicester.

References

129
Cravens multiple units
Non-passenger multiple units
Train-related introductions in 1958